Kaya Stewart (born 28 February 2000) is an English-American singer and songwriter. She is the daughter of the musician Dave Stewart. She released a single "In Love with" in 2015.

Early life
Kaya Stewart was born in London, but was raised in Los Angeles, California, with her half-brothers, Sam and Django. She also has a sister Indya. Her mother is the Dutch photographer Anoushka Fisz and her father is the songwriter-producer-musician Dave Stewart, notably of the 1980s band Eurythmics.

Growing up in a musical family, Stewart constantly performed for her family and friends. She has said that she is greatly inspired by her father's friend Annie Lennox. Lennox was a former partner in Eurythmics and mentored Kaya.

Music career
Her first single, "In Love with a Boy", from her first album for Warner Bros. Records was released 10 July 2015. The song set a record for being added to a total of 85 pop stations at launch, the most ever for a new artist. In August 2016, she released her album, Kaya Stewart.

Discography

Studio albums
Kaya Stewart (2016)

Extended plays
Miss Kaya (2021)

Singles

References

2000 births
Warner Records artists
Singers from Los Angeles
Singers from London
English emigrants to the United States
American people of Dutch descent
American women pop singers
American pop rock singers
Living people
Songwriters from California
21st-century American women singers
21st-century English women singers
21st-century English singers
21st-century American singers